The 1996–97 Pacific Tigers men's basketball team represented the University of the Pacific during the 1996–97 NCAA Division I men's basketball season. The Tigers were led by ninth-year head coach Bob Thomason and played their home games at the Alex G. Spanos Center in Stockton, California as members of the Big West Conference.

Roster

Schedule and results

|-
!colspan=9 style=| Regular season

|-
!colspan=9 style=| Big West tournament

|-
!colspan=9 style=| NCAA tournament

Source:

References

Pacific Tigers men's basketball seasons
Pacific
Pacific
Pacific
Pacific